El Cedro is a corregimiento in Macaracas District, Los Santos Province, Panama with a population of 450 as of 2010. Its population as of 1990 was 461; its population as of 2000 was 489.

References

Corregimientos of Los Santos Province